LLY could refer to:

 Eli Lilly and Company; New York Stock Exchange symbol LLY.
 Llwynypia railway station, Wales; National Rail station code LLY.
 LLY, an engine model produced by General Motors.
 South Jersey Regional Airport, United States; IATA airport code LLY.